Nikolaos Triantafyllakos (8 November 1855, Tripoli - 16 September 1939) was a Prime Minister of Greece during a tumultuous time in Greek history in August/September 1922.

He represented the prefecture of Arcadia in the Hellenic Parliament.  As the Greek army was losing battles and ceding territory to the Turkish National Movement in 1922 in the war in Asia Minor, the political situation in Athens began to deteriorate. 

The cabinet of Petros Protopapadakis resigned on 28 August, Nikolaos Kalogeropoulos was entrusted by King Constantine with the formation of a new ministry. After two days spent in negotiations he failed in his task, and Nikolaos Triantafyllakos, the ex-high commissioner of Greece at Constantinople, was summoned, and succeeded with difficulty in forming a makeshift government.

In the meantime, excitement and dissatisfaction were steadily growing among the population, and strict measures were necessary for the maintenance of order. On 11 September, martial law was proclaimed, following the revolt of 8,000 troops and their officers in Thessaloniki, who sent word to Athens demanding the abdication of King Constantine and the imprisonment of the former prime ministers, Dimitrios Gounaris and Nikolaos Stratos. This revolt was followed by a widespread rebellion of troops evacuated from Asia Minor to the islands of Mytilene, Chios, and Crete. The army contingents in Mytilene formed a Revolutionary Committee headed by Colonel Stylianos Gonatas, which despatched by aeroplane the following demands to Athens: the dismissal of the government, the dissolution of the parliament, the holding of new elections, and the abdication of King Constantine in favour of the Crown Prince, Crown Prince George. The revolutionary movement swiftly spread to other centres of Greece and to the Greek gunboats stationed at Mytilene and in and about the port of Piraeus. The Cabinet and Prime Minister Triantafyllakos immediately resigned on 16 September, and that day King Constantine abdicated for the second time in the course of his career, and the king's eldest son succeeded to the throne of Greece as King George II.

Triantafyllakos died in 1939.

References

1855 births
1939 deaths
20th-century prime ministers of Greece
People from Tripoli, Greece
Prime Ministers of Greece
Members of the Greek Senate
Justice ministers of Greece
Ministers of the Interior of Greece